William Lueck (born April 7, 1946) is a former guard in the National Football League who played 98 games for the Green Bay Packers and eleven games for the Philadelphia Eagles.

Lueck was the 26th overall pick of the 1968 NFL/AFL Draft out of the University of Arizona, played eight seasons in the NFL, and retired prior to the  season.  When hall of famer Jerry Kramer retired after the 1968 season, Lueck succeeded him at

References

External links

1946 births
Living people
People from Buckeye, Arizona
Sportspeople from the Phoenix metropolitan area
Players of American football from Arizona
American football offensive guards
Arizona Wildcats football players
Green Bay Packers players
Philadelphia Eagles players